A crepe maker is a cooking device used to make crepes, galettes, pancakes, blinis or tortillas. It should not be mistaken for a regular pan or a crepe pan.

Origins

Crepe makers were originally large cast-iron plates set over the fire to cook cereal-based batters. The machines have since evolved and the cast-iron plates were set on top of stainless steel frames. These first machines were electric machines, and later on, gas crepe griddles were developed as well. Although professional cast-iron crepe makers usually need to be seasoned, non-stick cast-iron griddles can now be commonly found on the market.

Denomination

Crepe cooking machines are commonly referred to as crepe makers or crepe griddles.

They are also known as billig, mainly in Brittany, France, where crêpes originate. Billig is a mutated form of the breton word pillig meaning "crepe maker".

See also
 Krampouz, crepe maker manufacturer
 Tava

References
 https://web.archive.org/web/20120608132553/http://chefcrepe.com/history-about-crepes.htm?sm=1

Cooking appliances
Pancakes